Josef Puhm (10 March 1877 – July 1961) was an Austrian fencer who competed in the 1912 Summer Olympics.

He was part of the Austrian sabre team, but due to being the unused substitute he was not awarded a (silver) medal. In the individual foil event he was eliminated in the first round. After qualifying for the individual sabre quarterfinals, he did not compete in this stage.

References

1877 births
1961 deaths
Austrian male fencers
Austrian sabre fencers
Olympic fencers of Austria
Fencers at the 1912 Summer Olympics
Sportspeople from the Austro-Hungarian Empire